Luigi is a video game series of platform games and puzzle games that is a spin-off of the Mario franchise published and produced by Nintendo. The series revolves around Luigi, Mario's brother. Luigi games have been released for Nintendo video game consoles and handhelds dating from the Nintendo Entertainment System to the Nintendo Switch. Two of the original Nintendo Entertainment System Mario games have been ported to Wii U and altered to feature Luigi as the protagonist.

Luigi was introduced in the 1983 Game & Watch game Mario Bros., where he and Mario work in a factory on a double screen. The first game to star Luigi was the 1990 game Luigi's Hammer Toss, as well as being the first game to use the Luigi branding.

List

Luigi's Mansion series

Others

Mini-games
Nintendo Land for Wii U features an attraction called "Luigi's Ghost Mansion". It is inspired by Luigi's Mansion and based on the 2003 game Pac-Man Vs. "Luigi's Ghost Mansion" involves up to four players dressed like Luigi, Mario, Waluigi and Wario respectively, who assume the roles of "ghost trackers" and explore a haunted house to hunt for the fifth player, who is the ghost.

Included in NES Remix 2 is "Super Luigi Bros.", which is a Luigi-themed and mirrored version of Super Mario Bros. It features Luigi's higher jumping ability, which had not been originally introduced until the 1986 Japanese sequel Super Mario Bros. 2.

An unlockable Luigi-themed version of Mario Bros. titled "Luigi Bros." was also included with Super Mario 3D World.

References 

Video game franchises
Luigi
 
Luigi video games